Colonel Robert Anstruther (31 December 1757 – 1832) was a Scottish soldier in the British Army, and briefly a politician.

He was the son of Sir John Anstruther of that Ilk, 2nd Bt. and Janet Fall. He married Anne Nairne, daughter of Colonel Alexander Nairne and Preston née Balneavis on 9 May 1801.

He was the Member of Parliament (MP) for  Anstruther Burghs from 1793 to 1794. He gained the rank of Colonel in the service of the 68th Regiment.

References
 [www.thepeerage.com]
 Burke's Peerage

1757 births
1832 deaths
Members of the Parliament of Great Britain for Scottish constituencies
British MPs 1790–1796
68th Regiment of Foot officers
Younger sons of baronets
Robert, MP